Lullymore is a civil parish in County Kildare in Ireland. It is in the historical barony of Offaly East.
The lowest observed 20th century air temperature in Ireland, -18.8 °C was measured at Lullymore on 2 January 1979.

Location
Lullymore is situated on the R414 between Rathangan and Allenwood. The village forms an island of arable land, surrounded on all sides by the Bog of Allen.

Lullymore is situated 6 miles from Rathangan and approx 3 miles from Allenwood.

Business
Lullymore briquette factory, operated by Bord Na Mona opened in 1936 and closed in 1992 due to falling demand for its products.

Sport and amenities
Lullymore Heritage & Discovery Park is a visitor attractions in the Kildare region. It is a destination for families, school tours, birthday parties and tourists.

The Bog of Allen Nature Centre, run by Irish Peatland Conservation Council, is a national 'centre of excellence' for peatland education, research and conservation. Facilities include a peatland museum, exhibitions about the Bog of Allen, a research library, habitats and gardens including the largest garden of carnivorous plants in Ireland and the U.K.

See also
 List of towns and villages in Ireland

References

Towns and villages in County Kildare
Civil parishes of County Kildare